The 2017 Netball New Zealand Super Club was the inaugural Netball New Zealand Super Club tournament. With a team coached by Reinga Bloxham, captained by Wendy Frew and featuring Gina Crampton, Jhaniele Fowler-Reid, Shannon Francois, and Jane Watson, Southern Steel finished the tournament as inaugural winners. Steel went through the tournament unbeaten, defeating Northern Mystics 79–58 in the final.
All the matches were hosted at the Trafalgar Centre in Nelson between 2 July and 7 July 2007. All the matches were broadcast live on Sky Sport (New Zealand).

Teams
The tournament featured eight teams. These included the top three from the 2017 ANZ Premiership season – Southern Steel, Central Pulse and Northern Mystics.

Notes
 Celtic Flames were effectively the Wales national netball team plus guests.  Wales play as Celtic Dragons in the Netball Superleague. The Celtic Flames squad featured past and present Dragons players, including Chelsea Lewis and Nia Jones. They also included two New Zealand internationals as guest players, Anna Thompson and Temalisi Fakahokotau of Mainland Tactix.

 Marama Vou were a Netball Fiji representative team featuring mainly Fiji under-19 players. The team also included Brooke Leaver and Erikana Pedersen of Mainland Tactix as guest players.

 The New South Wales Institute of Sport team was effectively a combined New South Wales Swifts and Giants Netball team. Its head coach was Briony Akle while Julie Fitzgerald was an assistant coach.

Group A

Matches
Day 1

 
Day 2

Day 3

Final ladder

Group B

Matches
Day 1

Day 2

Day 3

Final ladder

5th/8th place classification

Semi-finals

7th/8th place match

5th/6th place match
Celtic Flames finished in fifth place, ahead of all other invited international teams outside Australia and New Zealand.

1st/4th Play offs

Semi-finals

Third place play-off

Final

Final standings

References

2017
2017 in netball
2017 in New Zealand netball
2017 in Australian netball
2017 in Welsh women's sport
2017 in Fijian sport
2017 in South African women's sport
2017 in Trinidad and Tobago sport
July 2017 sports events in New Zealand